Ali Faik Zaghloul (3 March 1924 – 13 October 1995) was an Egyptian radio presenter. He is considered the father of Egyptian radio variety shows.

References

1924 births
1995 deaths
Egyptian radio presenters
Egyptian television presenters